Ogbonnia "Obo" Okoronkwo (born April 24, 1995) is an American football defensive end for the Cleveland Browns of the National Football League (NFL). He played college football at Oklahoma.

Early years
Ogbonnia was born in Gainesville, Florida. He is of Nigerian descent.

College career
As a junior in 2016, Okoronkwo had 71 tackles, 12 tackles for loss, and nine sacks. As a senior in 2017, he won the Big 12 Defensive Player of the Year and was named an All-American while recording 75 tackles, 17 tackles for loss, and eight sacks.

Professional career

Los Angeles Rams
Okoronkwo was drafted by the Los Angeles Rams in the fifth round (160th overall) in the 2018 NFL Draft. He was placed on the physically unable to perform list to start the 2018 season due to foot surgery he had in May. He was activated off PUP on November 5, 2018.

On October 20, 2020, Okoronkwo was placed on injured reserve after suffering an elbow injury. He was activated on December 5, 2020.

On September 2, 2021, Okoronkwo was placed on injured reserve. He was activated on October 2. Okoronkwo won the Super Bowl when the Rams defeated the Cincinnati Bengals 23-20.

Houston Texans
On March 23, 2022, Okoronkwo signed a one-year contract with the Houston Texans.

Cleveland Browns
On March 15, 2023, Okoronkwo signed a three-year, $19 million contract with the Cleveland Browns.

References

External links
Oklahoma Sooners bio
 Ogbonnia Okoronkwo on Twitter

1995 births
Living people
American sportspeople of Nigerian descent
Players of American football from Houston
Nigerian players of American football
American football linebackers
American football defensive ends
Oklahoma Sooners football players
All-American college football players
Los Angeles Rams players
Players of American football from Gainesville, Florida
Houston Texans players
Cleveland Browns players